Alexandra Helbling (born 25 October 1993 in Sri Lanka) is a Swiss Paralympic athlete who competes in sprinting and middle distance running events in international level events.

References

1993 births
Living people
People from Nottwil
Paralympic athletes of Switzerland
Swiss female wheelchair racers
Athletes (track and field) at the 2012 Summer Paralympics
Swiss people of Sri Lankan descent
Medalists at the World Para Athletics European Championships
Sportspeople from the canton of Lucerne